Ward & Co. was a London-based stained glass manufacturer in the mid-nineteenth-century that predominantly focused on ecclesiastical commissions. It was the firm of choice for architect John Tarring of London. It is believed to have become defunct before 1863 and operated out of 27 Paternoster Row, London.

Works
1848: Windows in the former Horbury Chapel, now Kensington Temple (London)(designed by John Tarring of London)
1850: Clapham Grafton Square Congregational Church (designed by John Tarring of London)
1857: Linden Grove Chapel (Peckenham Rye) (designed by John Tarring of London)

References

English stained glass artists and manufacturers
Glassmaking companies of England
Defunct glassmaking companies
Defunct companies based in London